Mode 1 may refer to:
 Mode I (archaeology), a prehistoric industry
 Mode 1, a sociological term for the production of knowledge; see Mode 2